Francesco Colitto (8 February 1897, Carovilli – 16 February 1989) was an Italian politician. He represented the Common Man's Front in the Constituent Assembly of Italy and the Italian Liberal Party in the Chamber of Deputies from 1948 to 1963.

Footnotes

1897 births
1989 deaths
People from the Province of Isernia
Common Man's Front politicians
Italian Liberal Party politicians
Members of the Constituent Assembly of Italy
Deputies of Legislature I of Italy
Deputies of Legislature II of Italy
Deputies of Legislature III of Italy
Politicians of Molise